Richard Lippincott may refer to:

 Richard Lippincott (Quaker) (1615–1683), early settler of Shrewsbury, New Jersey
 Richard Lippincott (Loyalist) (1745–1826), American-born Loyalist who served in the British army during the American War of Independence